Siberia, also known as Angaraland (or simply Angara) and Angarida, is an ancient craton in the heart of Siberia. Today forming the Central Siberian Plateau, it formed an independent landmass prior to its fusion into Pangea during the Late Carboniferous-Permian. The Verkhoyansk Sea, a passive continental margin, was fringing the Siberian Craton to the east in what is now the East Siberian Lowland.

Angaraland was named in the 1880s by Austrian geologist Eduard Suess who erroneously believed that in the Paleozoic Era there were two large continents in the Northern Hemisphere: "Atlantis", North America connected to Europe by a peninsula (=Greenland and Iceland); and "Angara-land", eastern Asia, named after the Angara River in Siberia.

Precambrian history
About 2.5 billion years ago (in the Siderian Period), Siberia was part of a continent called Arctica, along with the Canadian Shield. Around 1.1 billion years ago (in the Stenian Period), Siberia became part of the supercontinent of Rodinia, a state of affairs which lasted until the Cryogenian about 750 million years ago when it broke up, and Siberia became part of the landmass of Protolaurasia. During the Ediacaran Period around 600 million years ago, Protolaurasia became part of the southern supercontinent of Pannotia but around 550 million years ago, both Pannotia and Protolaurasia split up to become the continents of Laurentia, Baltica and Siberia.

Paleozoic history

Siberia was an independent continent through the early Paleozoic until, during the Carboniferous Period, it collided with the minor continent of Kazakhstania. A subsequent collision with Euramerica/Laurussia during the Late Carboniferous-Permian formed Pangea.

Mesozoic and Cenozoic history
Pangaea split up during the Jurassic though Siberia stayed with Laurasia. Laurasia gradually split up during the Cretaceous with Siberia remaining part of present-day northeastern Eurasia. Today, Siberia forms part of the landmass of Afro-Eurasia. To the east it is joined to the North American Plate at the Chersky Range. In around 250 million years from now Siberia may be in the subtropical region and part of the new supercontinent of Pangaea Ultima.

Features
Akitkan Orogen
Aldan Shield
Anabar Shield
Birekte Terrane
Daldyn Terrane
Magan Terrane
Olenyok Uplift
Tunguska Basin
Tungus Terrane

See also

References

External links
 (History of Siberia as well as other parts of Asia)

Historical continents
Tectonic plates
Historical tectonic plates
Continent
Paleozoic Asia
Paleozoic geology
Geology of Russia
Natural history of Asia
North Asia
Geology of Krasnoyarsk Krai
Geology of the Sakha Republic